The 1974 Rothmans International Tennis Tournament was a men's professional tennis tournament held on indoor carpet courts in the Royal Albert Hall in London, England. It was the fourth edition of the tournament and was held from 15 to 23 February 1974. The event was part of the 1974 World Championship Tennis circuit. Sixth-seeded Björn Borg won the singles title.

Finals

Singles
 Björn Borg defeated  Mark Cox 6–7(4–7), 7–6(8–6), 6–4
 It was Borg's second singles title of the year and of his career.

Doubles
 Björn Borg /  Ove Bengtson defeated  Mark Farrell /  John Lloyd 7–6, 6–3

References

External links
 ITF tournament edition details

Rothmans International Tennis Tournament
Rothmans International Tennis Tournament
Rothmans International Tennis Tournament
Rothmans International Tennis Tournament
Rothmans International Tennis Tournament